Ulysses (pronounced ) is a city in and the county seat of Grant County, Kansas, United States.  It is named after Ulysses S. Grant, the 18th President of the United States.  As of the 2020 census, the population of the city was 5,788.

History

In 1831, south of the future site of Ulysses, Kansas, then a part of Northern Mexico Territory, mountain man and explorer Jedediah Smith was killed by Comanche warriors, on May 27, 1831.  The first Ulysses, town, founded in June 1885, was located approximately two miles east of present-day Ulysses. Approximately six weeks later Ulysses' first newspaper, the Grant County Register, began publication.

From February 1892 through August 1893, Ulysses had two weekly newspapers, the Ulysses Tribune and the Grant County Republican; both papers were political in nature. The Grant County Republican represented the Republican Party, and the Ulysses Tribune represented the Alliance Party. The Grant County Republican constitutes the predecessor of the current-day Ulysses News, which claims to be Grant County's oldest surviving business, although it has operated under numerous names, editor/publishers, and management.

In the Grant County Register, Volume 1, #1, dated July 21, 1885, the following story was published:

Ulysses, everything is newness and bustle, when a month ago on the 7th of June six thousand head of cattle were rounded up on a gentle western slope near a beautiful lake. Now there is a bustling, prosperous young city, and all the country is dotted with settlements. The town company offers fine inducements to all wanting to embark in business, no better location can be found. We have several buildings already up, and a good hotel with 16 rooms.

Another publication, the Ulysses Tribune, published in March 1887:

Ulysses is the booming town of old Grant County, Kansas. The old county lines will be established by the present legislature beyond doubt, and Ulysses is bound to be the county seat. Ulysses has more natural advantages than any other town in western Kansas. She is on the direct line of the new east and west railroad, and a railroad is to be built from Lakin south to Ulysses, thus insuring her of two railroads. In other towns water is to be found at a depth of one to three hundred feet, but in Ulysses pure water is found at 30 feet.

In its prime, "Old" Ulysses boasted four hotels (the most notable, Hotel Edwards, pictured herein, which was moved to "New Ulysses" in 1909, and has been preserved/restored, currently resting on the grounds of The Historic Adobe Museum for Grant County, Kansas today), twelve restaurants, twelve saloons, a bank, six gambling houses, a large schoolhouse, a church, a newspaper office, and an opera house to serve the approximately 1500 residents. When Old Ulysses moved to New Ulysses in 1909, the opera house was set in what is today the front lawn of the current day court house, where it was converted into being the Grant County courthouse, with county offices on the first floor, and high school classes being held on the second floor, until the first dedicated building for a high school was put in service in 1923. During the 1930s WPA era, the current Grant County courthouse was constructed behind it, and this building was destroyed.

According to the Grant County Register, in February 1888, the Supreme Court of Kansas declared Ulysses the temporary county seat of Grant County. The county seat status was contested by another early Grant County settlement, Cincinnati, throwing the determination into state courts. During this same general time frame of 1887–1888, Grant County itself was in a state of formation, de-formation, ultimate re-formation and re-organization, with that controversy being resolved and the first officers of Grant County being sworn in June 18, 1888.

The years 1885 through 1888 and the first half of 1889, were boom times and growing years for early day Ulysses; the second half of 1889 brought drought, and the boom began to fade.

By the early 1900s, Ulysses was the last surviving town in Grant County, and by 1906, Ulysses was faced with increasingly hard times and desperation. According to the Grant County History book, the population of Ulysses had dwindled from that of a flourishing town to a hamlet of about 40 people.

24 years later, after the initial founding, in February 1909, the early day residents of "Old" Ulysses began moving the remains of the town to its present location.

The early town of Ulysses had been bonded heavily for improvements that were never made. The bonds were issued and sold and the money pocketed by early grafters. "Old" Ulysses dwindled from a flourishing town of approximately 1,500 residents in the late 1880s to a hamlet of 100 in 1908. Facing a staggering debt of $84,000 (US$  in ), for which there was absolutely nothing to show, the situation was desperate.

Some of the bond holders brought suit and took judgments for several thousand dollars against the city for delinquent interest. The citizens of Ulysses were forced to pay a high levy to meet payment on the judgment. This levy included a 600% increase in the realty taxes, and a 362% increase on personal property taxes.

After paying a year of exorbitant taxes, came the decision which few towns make, the citizens decided to take their belongings and move off the old town site, and out of the school district. The unity the citizens displayed in reaching this decision deserves credit, and the determination they displayed in putting this gigantic plan in operation has become a significant portion of Ulysses and Grant County history.

The city fathers moved approximately two miles west, and purchased a quarter of land that was deeded to the New Ulysses Town Company. After the land was surveyed into a new town site, the town began the move. The move began the first of February 1909, and continued for approximately three months. Skids were used to move the larger buildings, and the smaller ones were loaded onto wagons. Horse power was used to move the loads. It was necessary to move these structures downhill, through a large draw, and uphill to the new locations.

It took several days to move some of the buildings. The larger buildings were cut into sections and moved a section at a time. It took 60 horses to move just one section of the old hotel. The courthouse and the post office remained on the old town site until June 1909, when New Ulysses was officially declared the county seat.

The move that began in February was completed in June 1909, when every resident with their homes, business houses and belongings moved from the old town site. The inhabitants moved to the new location, two and one half miles west, crossing the Lakin draw at the bottom of an intervening valley, and built a new town called New Ulysses. Later in 1909, with the move complete, the former citizens left the old town site just as they had found it, a rolling tract of prairie.

On September 11th, 1992 Ulysses was chosen as the capital of the proposed state of "West Kansas" and hosted the states constitutional convention. The proclamation of the state was a protest due to Governor Joan Finney both increasing rural taxation and decreasing rural school funding. No formal petition for secession was never presented to the Kansas Legislature and the movement died out rather quickly.

Geography
Ulysses is located at  (37.580055, -101.357532).

Climate

Demographics

2010 census

As of the census of 2010, there were 6,161 people, 2,140 households, and 1,618 families residing in the city. The racial makeup of the city was 78.7% White, 0.7% African American, 1.4% Native American, 0.4% Asian, 16.1% from other races, and 2.6% from two or more races. Hispanic or Latino people of any race were 49.0% of the population.

There were 2,140 households, of which 42.5% had children under the age of 18 living with them, 60.9% were married couples living together, 9.5% had a female householder with no husband present, 5.2% had a male householder with no wife present, and 24.4% were non-families. 21.8% of all households were made up of individuals, and 8.1% had someone living alone who was 65 years of age or older. The average household size was 2.84 and the average family size was 3.32.

The median age in the city was 32.4 years. 31.6% of residents were under the age of 18; 8.7% were between the ages of 18 and 24; 25.1% were from 25 to 44; 24% were from 45 to 64; and 10.7% were 65 years of age or older. The gender makeup of the city was 50.6% male and 49.4% female.

2000 census
As of the census of 2000, there were 5,960 people, 2,086 households, and 1,577 families residing in the city. The racial makeup of the city was 75.12% White, 0.29% African American, 0.96% Native American, 0.45% Asian, 21.19% from other races, and 2.00% from two or more races. Hispanic or Latino people of any race were 37.52% of the population.

There were 2,086 households, out of which 43.0% had children under the age of 18 living with them, 64.0% were married couples living together, 8.5% had a female householder with no husband present, and 24.4% were non-families. 22.0% of all households were made up of individuals, and 9.1% had someone living alone who was 65 years of age or older. The average household size was 2.82 and the average family size was 3.33.

In the city, the population was spread out, with 32.7% under the age of 18, 8.4% from 18 to 24, 28.2% from 25 to 44, 19.8% from 45 to 64, and 10.9% who were 65 years of age or older. The median age was 32 years. For every 100 females, there were 98.7 males. For every 100 females age 18 and over, there were 94.0 males.

The median income for a household in the city was $42,675, and the median income for a family was $47,734. Males had a median income of $36,688 versus $22,017 for females. The per capita income for the city was $17,079. About 6.7% of families and 10.2% of the population were below the poverty line, including 14.3% of those under age 18 and 9.0% of those age 65 or over.

Transportation

Roads
U.S. Route 160 runs east–west through Ulysses, continuing across the state of Kansas.  K-25 (Kansas highway) runs north–south through the city and the state of Kansas

Air
Ulysses Airport (KULS) serves the county and the region with a 6,000 ft. x 100' north south (35-17) runway and a second 4'600 x 60' runway (12-30).

Media

Television
Ulysses is in the Wichita-Hutchinson, Kansas television market. 

KDGU-LD is licensed to Ulysses, Kansas and carries the signal of KDGL-LD in Sublette, Kansas.  KDGU-LD broadcasts on RF channel 33, but viewers see channel 23.

Notable people 
 Gary Bender, sports broadcaster
 Sheri Dew, CEO of Deseret Book
 Karen Dillon, filmmaker and arts educator
 Sarah Noriega (Sulentor), athlete and Olympian (women's volleyball)
 Eugene Pulliam, newspaper publisher
 Jedediah Smith (1799-1831), mountain man and explorer; killed by Comanches south of Ulysses at Wagon Bed Spring

References

Further reading

External links

 City of Ulysses
 Ulysses - Directory of Public Officials
 Ulysses USD 214
 Ulysses City Map, KDOT

Cities in Kansas
County seats in Kansas
Cities in Grant County, Kansas